Muricidae is a large and varied taxonomic family of small to large predatory sea snails, marine gastropod mollusks, commonly known as murex snails or rock snails. With about 1,600 living species, the Muricidae represent almost 10% of the Neogastropoda. Additionally, 1,200 fossil species have been recognized. Numerous subfamilies are recognized, although experts disagree about the subfamily divisions and the definitions of the genera.
Many muricids have unusual shells which are considered attractive by shell collectors and by interior designers.

Shell description
Muricid shells are variably shaped, generally with a raised spire and strong sculpture with spiral ridges and often axial varices (typically three or more varices on each whorl), also frequently bearing spines, tubercles, or blade-like processes. Periostracum is absent in this family. The aperture is variable in shape; it may be ovate to more or less contracted, with a well-marked anterior siphonal canal that may be very long. The shell's outer lip is often denticulated inside, sometimes with a tooth-like process on its margin. The columella is smoothish to weakly ridged. The operculum is corneous and of variable thickness, with the nucleus near the anterior end or at about midlength of the outer margin.

Many muricids have episodic growth, which means their shells grow in spurts, remaining the same size for a while (during which time the varix develops) before rapidly growing to the next size stage. The result is the series of above mentioned varices on each whorl.

Life habits
Most species of muricids are carnivorous, active predators that feed on other gastropods, bivalves, and barnacles. The access to the soft parts of the prey is typically obtained by boring a hole through the shell by means of a softening secretion and the scraping action of the radula. Because of their carnivory, some species may be considered pests because they can cause considerable destruction both in exploited natural beds of bivalves, and in farmed areas of commercial bivalves.

Muricids lay eggs in protective, corneous capsules, the size and shape of which vary by species. From these capsules the crawling juveniles, or more rarely planktonic larvae, hatch.

Historical value
Members of the family were harvested by early Mediterranean peoples, with the Phoenicians possibly the first to do so, to extract an expensive, vivid, stable dye known as Tyrian purple, imperial purple, or royal purple.

The fossil record
The family Muricidae first appears in the fossil record during the Aptian age of the Cretaceous period.

Subfamilies

According to the taxonomy of the Gastropoda by Bouchet & Rocroi (2005) the family Muricidae consists of these subfamilies:
 Aspellinae Keen, 1971
Coralliophilinae Chenu, 1859 - synonym: Magilidae Thiele, 1925
Ergalataxinae Kuroda, Habe & Oyama, 1971
Haustrinae Tan, 2003
Muricinae Rafinesque, 1815
Muricopsinae Radwin & d'Attilio, 1971
Ocenebrinae Cossmann, 1903
Pagodulinae Barco, Schiaparelli, Houart & Oliverio, 2012
Rapaninae Gray, 1853 - synonym: Thaididae Jousseaume, 1888
Tripterotyphinae d'Attilio & Hertz, 1988
Trophoninae Cossmann, 1903
Typhinae Cossmann, 1903
Synonyms
Subfamily Drupinae Wenz, 1938: synonym of Rapaninae Gray, 1853
Genus Drupinia [sic]: synonym of Drupina Dall, 1923
Genus Galeropsis Hupé, 1860: synonym of Coralliophila H. Adams & A. Adams, 1853
 Tritoninae Gray, 1847: synonym of Ranellidae Gray, 1854 (Invalid: type genus placed on the Official Index by Opinion 886 [junior homonym of Triton Linnaeus, 1758])

References

Houart, R. (1994). Illustrated Catalogue of Recent Species of Muricidae named since 1971. 181 pp. [incl. 28 pls.], Verlag Christa Hemmen, Wiesbaden. .
Poutiers, J. M. (1998). Gastropods in: FAO Species Identification Guide for Fishery Purposes: The living marine resources of the Western Central Pacific Volume 1. Seaweeds, corals, bivalves and gastropods. Rome: FAO. page 553.
Rosenberg, Gary (1992) The Encyclopedia of Seashells. New York: Dorset Press.
Vaught, K.C. (1989) A Classification of the Living Mollusca. American Malacologists, Inc., Melbourne, Florida.

External links

 CAAB listing for family Muricidae
 George E.Radwin and Anthony D'Attilio: The Murex shells of the World, Stanford University press, 1976, 
 Pappalardo P., Rodríguez-Serrano E. & Fernández M. (2014). "Correlated Evolution between Mode of Larval Development and Habitat in Muricid Gastropods". PLoS ONE 9(4): e94104. 
 Miocene Gastropods and Biostratigraphy of the Kern River Area, California; United States Geological Survey Professional Paper 642 

 
Taxa named by Constantine Samuel Rafinesque